Hans Scholl (born 1942) is a German astronomer, who worked at the Astronomisches Rechen-Institut in Heidelberg, Germany, and at the Côte d'Azur Observatory in Nice, France. In 1999, he was part of a team that discovered three moons of Uranus: Prospero, Setebos and Stephano. He has also co-discovered 55 minor planets together with Italian astronomer Andrea Boattini at ESO's La Silla Observatory site in northern Chile during 2003–2005.

Scholl is known for his theoretical work on the orbits of minor planets. He has studied the orbital resonance of outer main-belt asteroids, as well as the orbits of 2062 Aten, a near-Earth object, and 2060 Chiron, a centaur and comet. His broad range of minor planet research included problems from mass determination to asteroid missions and from libration to depletion. He was honored by the outer main-belt asteroid 2959 Scholl, discovered by English–American astronomer Edward Bowell in 1983.

List of discovered minor planets

See also

References

External links 
 Observatory of Nice staff detail

1942 births
20th-century  German astronomers

Living people
Planetary scientists